is a Japanese long-distance runner.

University career
Takamiya twice competed at the Hakone Ekiden for Josai University.

2016 season
Takamiya finished 8th at the 2016 Tokyo Marathon, the highest finish for a male Japanese runner.  This placed him, along with Satoru Sasaki, in consideration for an Olympic spot.

References

Living people
1987 births
Josai University alumni
Japanese male long-distance runners
Japanese male marathon runners